Crassispira currani is a species of sea snail, a marine gastropod mollusk in the family Pseudomelatomidae.

Description
The length of the shell attains 11.1 mm; its diameter 4.3 mm.

Distribution
This species occurs in the Pacific Ocean from Mexico to Panama

References

External links
 Biolib.cz: Crassispira currani
 James H. McLean & Roy Poorman, A Revised Classification of the Family Turridae, with the Proposal of New Subfamilies, Genera, and Subgenera from the Eastern Pacific; The Veliger  vol. 14, 1971
  Tucker, J.K. 2004 Catalog of recent and fossil turrids (Mollusca: Gastropoda). Zootaxa 682:1–1295
 

currani
Gastropods described in 1971